Apoxestia is a genus of moths of the family Noctuidae.

Species
Apoxestia euchroa Dognin, 1912

References
Natural History Museum Lepidoptera genus database

Noctuidae